Konstantin Mikhailovich Simonov, born Kirill Mikhailovich Simonov (– 28 August 1979), was a  Soviet author, war poet, playwright and  wartime correspondent, arguably most famous for his 1941 poem  "Wait for Me".

Early years

Simonov was born in Petrograd in 1915. His mother, Princess Aleksandra Leonidovna Obolenskaya, came of the Rurikid Obolensky family. His father, Mikhail Agafangelovich Simonov, an officer in the Tsar's army, left Russia after the Revolution of 1917 and died in Poland sometime after 1921.  Konstantin's mother, Alexandra, remained in Russia with Konstantin. In 1919 his mother married Alexander Ivanishev, a Red Army officer and veteran of World War I.

Konstantin spent several years as a child in Ryazan while his stepfather worked as an instructor at a local military school. They later moved to Saratov, where Konstantin spent the remainder of his childhood. After completing a basic seven-year education in 1930 in Saratov, he went into the factory workshop school (Fabrichno-Zavodskoe Uchilishche-FZU) to become a lathe-turner. In 1931 his family moved to Moscow. After completing his precision-engineering course, Simonov went to work in a factory, where he remained until 1935. During these years he changed his given name from Kirill to Konstantin because he could not pronounce the sound "r" with an aristocratic lisp.

The first of Simonov's poems were published in 1936 in the journals Young Guard and October. After completing schooling at the Maxim Gorky Literature Institute in 1938, Simonov entered the Moscow Institute of History, Philosophy, and Literature. His time there was interrupted when he was sent as a war correspondent to cover the Battle of Khalkhin Gol of May–September 1939 in Mongolia. Simonov returned to the Institute in 1939.

Works

Simonov's first play, The History of One Love, was written in 1940, and performed on stage at the Memorial Lenin Komsomol Theater in Leningrad. He wrote his second play, A Lad from Our Town, in 1941. That same year he was impressed by Soviet resistance in this place, during which 39 German tanks have been destroyed in one day, and described this episode in The Living and the Dead trilogy.

Studying war correspondence at the Lenin Military-Political Academy, Simonov obtained the service rank of quartermaster of the second rank. At the beginning of World War II Simonov received a job with the official army newspaper Krasnaya Zvezda. Simonov rose through the army ranks becoming a senior battalion commissar in 1942, lieutenant colonel in 1943, and a colonel after the war.

During the war years, he wrote the plays Russian People, Wait for Me, So It Will Be, the short novel Days and Nights, and two books of poems, With You and Without You and War. His poem "Wait for Me", about a soldier in the war asking his beloved to wait for his return, remains one of the best-known poems in Russian literature. The poem was addressed to his future wife, the actress Valentina Serova. Many of his poems for Valentina were included in the book With You and Without You.

As a war correspondent, Simonov served in Romania, Bulgaria, Yugoslavia, Poland, and Germany, where he was present at the Battle of Berlin. After the war his collected reports appeared in Letters from Czechoslovakia, Slav Friendship, Yugoslavian Notebook and From the Black to the Barents Sea: Notes of a War Correspondent.

Post-war works

For three years after the war ended, Simonov served in foreign missions in Japan, the United States and China. From 1958 to 1960 he worked in Tashkent as the Central Asia correspondent for Pravda. His novel Comrades in Arms was published in 1952, and his longer novel, The Living and the Dead, in 1959. In 1961 his play, The Fourth, was performed at the Sovremennik Theatre. In 1963–64 he wrote the novel Soldatami ne rozhdaiutsia, which can be translated as "Soldiers Are Made, Not Born" or "One Isn't Born a Soldier." In 1970–71 he wrote a sequel The Last Summer.

For two spells, 1946–50 and 1954–58, Simonov was editor in chief of the journal Novy Mir. From 1950 through 1953, he was editor in chief of the Literary Gazette; from 1946 through 1959 and from 1967 through 1979, secretary of the Union of Writers of the USSR. In the year before his death, Simonov tried to create a special archive of memories of soldiers in the archives of the Defense Ministry in Podolsk, Moscow Region, but leaders of the army, in the high echelons, blocked the idea. Simonov died on 28 August 1979 in Moscow. According to his last will, he was cremated, and his ashes were scattered in Buynichi fields near Mogilev.

He is the central character in Orlando Figes' book The Whisperers (2007).

Awards and honors

Hero of Socialist Labour (1974)
Order of Lenin/Three Orders of Lenin
Order of the Red Banner
Order of the Patriotic War|Two Orders of the Patriotic War 1st class
Order of the Badge of Honour
Medal "For the Victory over Germany in the Great Patriotic War 1941–1945"
Medal "For the Defence of Odessa"
Medal "For the Defence of Stalingrad"
Lenin Prize (1974)
USSR State Prize (1942, 1943, 1946, 1947, 1949, 1950)
Order of the White Lion (Czechoslovak SSR)
Czechoslovak War Cross 1939–1945 (Czechoslovak SSR)
Order of Sukhbaatar (Mongolian SSR)
Vasilyev Brothers State Prize of the RSFSR (1966)

Film adaptations of Simonov's works

Numerous films were released in the Soviet Union on Simonov's scenarios and based on his works:

Lad from Our Town (1942), directed by Aleksandr Stolper
Wait for Me (1943), directed by Aleksandr Stolper
In the Name of the Fatherland (1943), directed by Vsevolod Pudovkin and Dmitriy Vasilyev (play Russian People)
Days and Nights (1945), directed by Aleksandr Stolper
The Russian Question (1947), directed by Mikhail Romm
The Immortal Garrison (1956)
The Normandy – Neman (1960), joint production by the USSR and France; together with Charles Spaak and Elsa Triolet
The Alive and the Dead (1964), directed by Aleksandr Stolper, starring Kirill Lavrov, Anatoli Papanov, Oleg Yefremov
Grenada, Grenada, My Grenada... (1967), documentary, co-directed with Roman Karmen, on the Spanish Civil War
Retribution (1969), directed by Aleksandr Stolper
The Case of Polynin (1970), directed by Aleksey Sakharov
The Fourth (1972), directed by Aleksandr Stolper
Twenty Days Without War (1976), directed by Aleksei German, starring Yuri Nikulin and Lyudmila Gurchenko
From Lopatin's Notes (1977), directed by Iosif Reichelgaus and Oleg Tabakov

References

External links

  The Poems by Konstantin Simonov

1915 births
1979 deaths
Writers from Saint Petersburg
People from Sankt-Peterburgsky Uyezd
Central Committee of the Communist Party of the Soviet Union candidate members
Second convocation members of the Soviet of the Union
Third convocation members of the Soviet of Nationalities
Russian male poets
Russian-language poets
Soviet newspaper editors
Soviet journalists
Russian male journalists
Soviet novelists
Soviet male writers
20th-century Russian poets
20th-century Russian male writers
Soviet poets
Soviet dramatists and playwrights
Soviet short story writers
20th-century Russian short story writers
War correspondents of World War II
Russian male novelists
Russian male short story writers
Soviet war correspondents
Soviet translators
Russian memoirists
Socialist realism writers
Lenin Military Political Academy alumni
Heroes of Socialist Labour
Recipients of the Order of Lenin
Recipients of the Order of the Red Banner
Lenin Prize winners
Stalin Prize winners
Recipients of the Vasilyev Brothers State Prize of the RSFSR
Recipients of the Czechoslovak War Cross
Maxim Gorky Literature Institute alumni
20th-century Russian journalists
Novy Mir editors
Second convocation members of the Supreme Soviet of the Soviet Union
Third convocation members of the Supreme Soviet of the Soviet Union
Deaths from lung cancer